The Samsung Galaxy A3 (2015) or Samsung Galaxy A3 2015 Edition is an Android aluminum smartphone manufactured by Samsung. It was introduced in October 2014, along with the larger and related Samsung Galaxy A5. Samsung Galaxy A3 (2016) is a successor to Samsung Galaxy A3.

Both Samsung Galaxy A3 models SM-A300F and SM-A300FU currently run Android 6.0.1 Marshmallow, however all other models can only be upgraded to Android 5.1 Lollipop.

Specifications 
 Rear Camera: 8 MP
 Front Camera: 5 MP
 System-on Chip: Qualcomm Snapdragon 410 (Quad-core 1.2 GHz, ARM Cortex-A53 64-bit CPU)
 Graphics Processor: Adreno 306
 Memory: 1 GB RAM (A300F), 1.5 GB RAM (SM-A300FU)
 Storage: 16 GB
 Battery: 1900 mAh (non-removable)
 Size: 4.5 in
 Resolution: 540 x 960 pixels (qHD), 245 ppi
 Operating System:Android 4.4.4 KitKat (upgradable to Android 6.0.1 Marshmallow)
 Weight: 110 g
 Dimensions: 130.1 x 65.5 x 6.9 mm
 Super AMOLED Display
Gorilla Glass 4

Models 
The phone was introduced in a sequence of models, with different features:

So, the most significant differences are between the models A300H/DS, compared to A300FU.

References

External links
 PhoneArena
 GSMArena
 DeTekno (Indonesian)
 Okazii (în Română)

Android (operating system) devices
Samsung mobile phones
Samsung Galaxy
Mobile phones introduced in 2014
Discontinued smartphones